Mpho Andrea Tutu van Furth (born 1963) is a South African Anglican priest, author and activist. She is the daughter of Leah and Archbishop Desmond Tutu. She coauthored two books with her father, and a biography about him with journalist Allister Sparks. She was ordained in 2003, but due to the regulations of the Anglican Church of South Africa, she was not permitted to function as a priest in the church after marrying a woman in 2015. In 2022 she began preaching in Amsterdam.

Biography

Early life 
Mpho Andrea Tutu was born in London to Nomalizo Tutu, a South African activist, and Desmond Tutu, an Anglican bishop. Both her parents are known for their work as anti-apartheid and human rights activists. Tutu has three siblings: Trevor Thamsanqa, Theresa Thandeka and Naomi Nontombi. She was 31 years old when apartheid ended in 1994.

As a child, Tutu had no desire to follow in her father's footprints as a priest and later described her path to the ministry as taking the "scenic route" and said she felt God calling her into the profession.

Career 

Tutu van Furth was ordained as a priest in the Episcopal Church of the United States in Springfield, Massachusetts, in 2003. Before her ordination, she was the director of the Discovery Program at All Saints Church in Worcester, Massachusetts. She received her master's degree from Episcopal Divinity School in Cambridge, Massachusetts, and after her ordination she began preaching at the historic Christ Church in Alexandria, Virginia.

Tutu van Furth has co-authored a number of books including Made for Goodness: And Why This Makes All the Difference, The Book of Forgiving: The Fourfold Path for Healing Ourselves and Our World and Tutu: The Authorised Portrait; The former two books were written with her father and the latter with journalist Allister Sparks. She has been an outspoken advocate for the importance of forgiveness. She made news for forgiving the murderer of her housekeeper in 2012. She and her father have advocated for forgiveness in the wake of racial tensions and police shootings in the United States. As a public speaker, she has shared the stage with The 14th Dalai Lama, Eckhart Tolle, Ken Robinson and others.

Tutu van Furth was the founding director of the Desmond and Leah Tutu Legacy Foundation and served as executive director from 2011 to 2016.

On 30 January 2022, Mpho Tutu van Furth was confirmed as pastor of Vrijburg, a church in Amsterdam, by the reverend Joost Röselaers.

Marriage and controversy 
In 2015, Tutu married , a Dutch professor of medicine, and moved to Amstelveen in the Netherlands. Shortly after the marriage, the Diocese of Saldanha Bay withdrew her license as a priest. Both of her parents were supportive of her marriage. According to the BBC, the Anglican Church of South Africa is looking at new guidelines for members who enter same-sex unions, but it is "not clear whether there will be any change when it comes to same-sex marriages of church clerics".

In regards to her marriage, Tutu van Furth said, "I had the extreme good fortune of growing up in a household with parents who were very clear about their faith and very clear about full inclusion of all people ... regardless of gender and gender identity and regardless of sexual orientation." Her father said in 2013 that he would never "worship a God who is homophobic" and both of them have been active in calls for LGBT equality. Desmond Tutu stated that he was "as passionate about [the campaign against homophobia] as I ever was about apartheid".

She had previously been married to Joseph Burris, with whom she had two children.

In September 2022, the Church of England's Diocese of Hereford refused a request to allow her to conduct a funeral in the diocese, that of her godfather and her father's friend the anti-apartheid campaigner Martin Kenyon, because she is married to a woman (the Church of England does not allow its clergy to marry the same sex). Former Bishop of Liverpool Paul Bayes criticised the decision and said: "We urgently need to make space for conscience, space for pastoral care, and space for love".

Awards 
2004 – South African Women for Women: Woman of Distinction Award
2007 – African Women of Empowerment Award
2010 – Abingdon Worship Annual Award

Published works 
 Made for Goodness: And Why This Makes All the Difference (2010; with Desmond Tutu)
 Tutu: The Authorised Portrait (2011; with Allister Sparks)
 The Book of Forgiving: The Fourfold Path for Healing Ourselves and Our World (2014; with Desmond Tutu)

References

External links 

Official website

1963 births
Living people
South African LGBT people
South African LGBT rights activists
Episcopal Divinity School alumni
Desmond Tutu
South African women writers
South African writers
South African women activists
South African activists
21st-century South African Anglican priests
LGBT Christian clergy
Women Anglican clergy